Richard Roger Lavigne (February 18, 1941 – May 21, 2021) was a laicized priest of the Roman Catholic Diocese of Springfield in Massachusetts and convicted sex offender. Lavigne was at the center of the priest abuse scandal in the Diocese of Springfield in Massachusetts with about 40 claims of sexual abuse of minors placed against him.

He was removed from ministry by Bishop John Marshall in 1991. He pleaded guilty to two counts of child sexual abuse on June 26, 1992, and was the only suspect named in the long-unsolved 1972 murder of 13-year-old altar boy Danny Croteau of Springfield, Massachusetts. In 1994, DNA tests failed to link Lavigne to the Croteau murder, and the Hampden County District Attorney, William Bennett, did not bring any charges against Lavigne.

In May 2003, when asked about the case by a reporter from The New York Times, My silence,' Mr. Lavigne replied, 'has been my salvation. Lavigne was laicized by the Holy See on  November 20, 2003.

According to the Massachusetts Sex Offender Registry, Lavigne spent the last two years of his life "in violation", and his last known residence was in Chicopee.

Lavigne died in May 2021 of acute hypoxia respiratory failure, as a result of COVID-19 pneumonia, just hours after the Hampden County district attorney Anthony D. Gulluni's office had begun preparing an arrest warrant in the 1972 case, based on deathbed admissions by Lavigne of specific details. Gullini declared Lavigne responsible for the death of Danny Croteau.

Two Springfield, Massachusetts, Roman Catholic bishops, Christopher Joseph Weldon (1905–1982) and Thomas Dupre, were named as pedophiles who each covered up the abuse and murder of Danny Croteau by Lavigne, who was in their charge.

References

Further reading

Cullen, Kevin, December 14, 2003, http://www.boston.com/news/local/massachusetts/articles/2003/12/14/a_priest_a_boy_a_mystery/

1941 births
2021 deaths
American people convicted of child sexual abuse
American murderers of children
Deaths from the COVID-19 pandemic in Massachusetts
People from Springfield, Massachusetts
People from Chicopee, Massachusetts
Roman Catholic Diocese of Springfield in Massachusetts
Catholic priests convicted of child sexual abuse
Laicized Roman Catholic priests
20th-century American Roman Catholic priests
Catholics from Massachusetts
American members of the clergy convicted of crimes
Catholic Church sexual abuse scandals in the United States